André Zimmer (19 September 1912 – 13 December 1984) was a Luxembourgian sprint canoeist, born in Longlaville, France, who competed in the late 1930s. He finished 13th in the folding K-2 10000 m event at the 1936 Summer Olympics in Berlin.

References
André Zimmer's profile at Sports Reference.com

1912 births
1984 deaths
Sportspeople  from Meurthe-et-Moselle
Canoeists at the 1936 Summer Olympics
Luxembourgian male canoeists
Olympic canoeists of Luxembourg